Dmitry Alimov (Dmitry Sergeyevich Alimov) (born August 17, 1974 in Samara, USSR) is a Silicon Valley-based entrepreneur and investor in technology businesses, founder and managing partner of the investment fund Frontier Ventures, co-founder of the online video service ivi.tv. He worked as a senior manager in major companies, such as Access Industries, Gazprom-Media, TNT, Amedia, ru-Net Ltd, Sputnik Group. In 2012, Russian business magazine, Secret Firmy, named Alimov as one of the Top-50 Russian Internet Millionaires. In 2016 the European CEO magazine named Dmitry Alimov Entrepreneur of the Year (Venture capital).

Biography 

Dmitry Alimov was born in 1974 in Samara, USSR (now Russia). He studied applied mathematics and computer science at the Samara State Aerospace University. In 1998, he graduated summa cum laude from the University of Missouri–St. Louis in the United States with a major in business administration (finance) and earned his MBA from Harvard Business School in 2004.

Alimov started his career at the mergers and acquisitions department of investment bank Renaissance Capital.

From 1998–2002, as the vice president of a $1 billion private equity and venture capital fund Sputnik Group, he managed a number of venture capital and private equity investments.

From 2001–2002, Alimov was the First Deputy General Director and a member of the Board of Directors of the TV channel TNT as well as a member of the Gazprom-Media Executive Committee.

In 2004, Alimov graduated from Harvard Business School with an MBA degree. During 2004, Leonard Blavatnik invited him to work for Access Industries (Eurasia). Alimov was in charge of the company's investment in media in Russia and CIS countries from 2004-2005.

In 2005, Alimov was appointed the managing director of Amedia and developed the company to lead the market in TV production in Russia.

In 2008, Alimov left Amedia and sold his equity interest in the company to Access Industries.

From 2007–2010, Alimov worked as the managing partner of ru-Net Ltd venture capital fund which invested in Yandex, Russia's leading search engine, and Ozon.ru, the first Russian online shop.

Alimov has backed major Internet companies in Russia. He co-founded and played a key role in the financing, launch, and growth of Russia's largest online video provider Ivi.ru and, on behalf of ru-Net Ltd, invested in the group, purchasing site Biglion.ru.

In 2011, Alimov founded a $50 million venture capital fund Frontier Ventures to invest in Internet businesses. In 2019, Frontier Ventures launched its second fund focused on US early stage technology companies.

Dmitry Alimov is a public critic of the Russian, United States and many other governments.

Frontier Ventures 

Frontier Ventures is an investment fund that invests in early-stage Internet businesses globally with a particular focus on businesses with strong network effects. It was founded in 2011 by Dmitry Alimov and ivi.ru Chairman Oleg Tumanov. The fund was officially launched in March, 2012. Frontier Ventures' investment team is based in Cupertino, California.

Dispute with Jim Rogers 

In 2003, his widely circulated e-mail exchange with the famous global investor Jim Rogers made Alimov, then a student at Harvard Business School, a prominent figure among businessmen and government officials. The dispute started after Rogers’ lecture at HBS. The co-founder of the Quantum Fund described Russia as a hopeless place for investors. Alimov wrote an e-mail to Rogers claiming that his statements and facts on Russia were not well-grounded. A long-lasting e-mail exchange that followed was eventually read by Alimov's fellow-students as well as businessmen and people from all around the world. The story was covered by The New Yorker, The New York Post and other international media.

In 2012, guest commentator Ben Aris in the Financial Times declared Alimov the winner of this debate after Rogers changed his stance on Russia and became an advisor to the agricultural fund run by Russian state-owned bank VTB Capital.

Personal life 

Dmitry Alimov is married to his wife, Julia Korneva, who is the founder of a blog on healthy lifestyle and longevity called "Live up!".

References

External links 
 Biography of Dmitry Alimov on Frontier Ventures web-site
 Business New Europe on Dmitry Alimov

1974 births
Living people
People from Samara, Russia
21st-century Russian businesspeople
Harvard Business School alumni
Russian expatriates in the United States
University of Missouri–St. Louis alumni
Russian businesspeople in the United States